William McKendree Robbins (October 26, 1828 – May 5, 1905) was a U.S. Representative from North Carolina.

Born in the old homestead near Trinity, North Carolina, Robbins pursued classical studies.
He attended Old Trinity College and graduated from Randolph-Macon College, Virginia, about 1850.
He studied law.
He was admitted to the bar in 1854 and commenced practice the same year in Eufaula, Alabama.
He served four years as major in the Fourth Alabama Regiment of the Confederate States Army during the Civil War.
In 1865, Robbins moved in Salisbury, North Carolina and continue to practice law.
He served as member of the North Carolina Senate in 1868 and 1872.

Robbins was elected as a Democrat to the Forty-third, Forty-fourth, and Forty-fifth Congresses (March 4, 1873 – March 4, 1879).
He served as chairman of the Committee on Expenditures in the Department of War (Forty-fourth Congress).
He was appointed by President Cleveland as the southern commissioner on the Gettysburg Battle Field Commission in 1894, which position he held until his death in Salisbury, North Carolina, on May 5, 1905.
He was interred in Oakwood Cemetery, Statesville, North Carolina.

Sources

External links 
 

1828 births
1905 deaths
Randolph–Macon College alumni
People of Alabama in the American Civil War
Confederate States Army officers
Democratic Party North Carolina state senators
Democratic Party members of the United States House of Representatives from North Carolina
19th-century American politicians
People from Trinity, North Carolina
Alabama lawyers
North Carolina lawyers